Madame Chiang Kai-shek: China's Eternal First Lady is a book written by of Laura Tyson Li about Soong Mei-ling, wife of modern China wartime leader Chiang Kai-shek.

Description

Laura Tyson Li called Soong Mei-ling "one of the most controversial and fascinating woman of the 20th century", who was, beside the wife of China's wartime leader Generalissimo Chiang Kai-shek, also his "chief adviser, interpreter, and propagandist".

Publisher

References

History books about China
Biographies (books)
Chiang Kai-shek family